Iolaus alexanderi, the Alexander's sapphire, is a butterfly in the family Lycaenidae. It is found in Ivory Coast (Taï National Park). The habitat consists of wet rainforests.

Adults are on wing in April and June.

References

Butterflies described in 2003
Iolaus (butterfly)
Endemic fauna of Ivory Coast
Butterflies of Africa